Iván Cifuentes Román (born 10 January 1996) is a Spanish footballer who plays as a forward for Arandina CF.

Club career
Born in Albacete, Castilla-La Mancha, Cifuentes finished his formation with local Albacete Balompié, making his senior debuts with the reserves in the 2012–13 campaign, in Tercera División. On 12 March 2014 he signed a new contract, running until 2017.

On 11 May 2014, aged only 17, Cifuentes made his first team debut by starting in a 2–0 away win against Real Balompédica Linense in the Segunda División B championship. He subsequently returned to the B-side, being a regular starter in the fourth tier.

On 4 June 2016 Cifuentes made his professional debut, coming on as a half-time substitute for Jason in a 0–2 Segunda División away loss against CD Numancia; his side was also already relegated from the division. On 15 August he moved to another reserve team, Valencia CF Mestalla, after impressing on a trial.

References

External links

Iván Cifuentes at La Preferente

1996 births
Living people
Sportspeople from Albacete
Spanish footballers
Footballers from Castilla–La Mancha
Association football forwards
Segunda División players
Segunda División B players
Tercera División players
Atlético Albacete players
Albacete Balompié players
Valencia CF Mestalla footballers
UD Logroñés players
Real Murcia Imperial players
CDA Navalcarnero players
Arandina CF players